The Poncione dei Laghetti (also known as Poncione della Bolla) is a mountain of the Lepontine Alps, overlooking the lakes Lago del Narèt and Lago del Sambuco in the canton of Ticino.

References

External links
 Poncione dei Laghetti on Hikr

Mountains of the Alps
Mountains of Switzerland
Mountains of Ticino
Lepontine Alps